Leveling is a social process in which the uniqueness of the individual is rendered non-existent by assigning equal value to all aspects of human endeavors, thus missing all the intricacies and subtle complexities of human identity. Leveling is highly associated with existential philosopher Søren Kierkegaard.

Overview
For Kierkegaard, leveling was the process of suppressing individuality to a point where the individual's uniqueness becomes non-existent and nothing meaningful in his existence can be affirmed:

However, Kierkegaard's idea of leveling wasn't one of making life meaningless but of making life equal because every single individual has equal access to the grace and gifts of God. He wasn't concerned with earthly and material goods.

German philosopher Martin Heidegger wrote of leveling: "by averageness and leveling down, everything gets obscured, and what has thus been covered up gets passed off as something familiar and accessible to everyone. ...by virtue of an insensitivity to all distinctions in level and genuineness, and in providing average intelligibility, opens up a standard world in which all distinctions between the unique and the general, the superior and the average, the important and the trivial have been leveled".

Heidegger's view of important things becoming mundane and non-specific points towards Nietzsche's concept of master–slave morality, in which the weak and disenfranchised reframe the positive traits of the strong and powerful as not worth pursuing.

See also
 Existentialism
 Nihilism
 Present age

References

External links
 Gregory B. Sadler, Existentialism: Soren Kierkegaard, "The Present Age", June 5, 2012. YouTube.
 Robert Shut, Soren Kierkegaard "The Present Age" (Part 1)
 Robert Shut, Soren Kierkegaard "The Present Age" (Part 2)

Søren Kierkegaard
Continental philosophy
Self
Value (ethics)